Iwan Griffiths is drummer for Welsh rock band The Automatic. Iwan originates from Cowbridge in Wales, and lives in Cardiff. He has a law degree from Cardiff University.

Musical career
Along with bandmates Rob and Frost he was in the lineup of the band's original format when they were known as White Rabbit, later changing their name to The Automatic, an idea of Iwan's, and recruiting screaming synth player Alex Pennie, and later guitarist Paul Mullen.

In an interview with Rhythm Magazine, Iwan explained that one of his influences at the time was Dominic Howard from the band Muse. Other influences on his drumming include John Bonham, Phil Collins, Stewart Copeland, and Bill Bruford.

Iwan has used a combination of acoustic and electric drums in both studios and live performances.

Iwan is a fan of television series LOST, and film series Star Wars, on 15 August 2008 Iwan was interviewed on Starwars.com talking about his love of the original trilogy (Star Wars, Empire Strikes Back and Return of the Jedi) and being a fan of the Lego Star Wars Game.

Equipment
Live
DW Drum Kits

Studio (During the recording of Not Accepted Anywhere)
Premier Drums

References

1985 births
Living people
Welsh rock drummers
The Automatic members
People from Cowbridge
21st-century drummers